Rockett's Landing (or simply Rocketts) is a new urbanist neighborhood in southeastern Richmond, Virginia on the border of Henrico County, Virginia and the north bank of the James River.  It was named after Baldwin Rockett, an 18th-century ship's captain born in April 1681 in Exeter, Devonshire, England.

The neighborhood was originally a factory and water tower and has been converted into mixed-use development with brick streets. It is served by the GRTC Pulse Rocketts Landing station.

Civil War

In the American Civil War, and still a suburban hamlet of Richmond at the time, the northern fringes of Rockett's Landing were chosen to become one of the two sites in the Richmond area to serve as a Confederate Navy shipyard as compensation for the loss of the Portsmouth Naval Shipyard in May 1862 (the other one having been William Armistead Graves' smaller "Graves's Yard" further upstream), with yard installations eventually straddling both sides of the James River. The yard ceased operations and was partially burnt by retreating Confederate troops, when Richmond fell to Union troops the next day on April 3, 1865, though the hamlet itself was spared according to the contemporary map, featured on the left.

When President Abraham Lincoln started his tour of the fallen city the following day, he came ashore at Rockett's Landing.

References

External links
Rocketts Landing

Neighborhoods in Richmond, Virginia